is a Japanese manga series written by Go Nagai and illustrated by Team Moon. It is part of the Devilman franchise created by Nagai. The manga ran in Kodansha's Monthly Young Magazine from November 2012 to July 2014, with its chapters collected in three tankōbon volumes.

Publication
Devilman VS. Hades is written by Go Nagai and illustrated by Team Moon. It was serialized in Kodansha's Monthly Young Magazine from November 14, 2012, to July 9, 2014. Kodansha collected its chapters in three tankōbon, released from June 6, 2013, to September 5, 2014.

In North America, Seven Seas Entertainment licensed the manga in 2017. The three volumes were released from March 13 to November 27, 2018.

Volume list

Reception
Mike Dent from Otaku USA called the first volume a "essentially nonstop action" and praised Team Moon's art work, stating that the character designs "stay true to the classics" of the original Devilman, but adding a "distinctive new touches to great effect".

References

External links
Devilman VS. Hades official website at Young Magazine 

Devilman
Horror anime and manga
Kodansha manga
Seinen manga
Seven Seas Entertainment titles